A private ski area is a membership based type of ski resort developed primarily for skiing, snowboarding, and other winter sports. Like a country club, private ski areas in North America offer exclusive memberships, usually based on an initiation fee and annual dues. In this context, it is the presence of exclusive memberships rather than private ownership that makes a ski area private.

Private ski areas offer a range of public access. Many smaller or more rural areas allow day tickets (sometimes with a daily cap) and/or trial memberships to be sold. Highly exclusive areas, namely Montana's 13,450 acre Yellowstone Club near Big Sky Resort, do not sell day tickets and require "that prospective members show evidence of a net worth of at least $3 million and pay a membership deposit of $250,000." in addition to the $16,000 annual fee and the mandatory purchase of property at the resort. The Hermitage Club in Vermont has two days a year when residents of the nearby towns of Wilmington and Dover can ski for free.

Furthermore, some of North America's more luxury public ski areas such as Colorado's Aspen, Telluride, and Vail now offer private clubs to supplement the publicly accessed skiing. Generally, large commercial ski areas in North America are not able to privatize access to trails or pistes due to the mandates of the federal bodies that own and seasonally lease public land to the commercial groups. Thus the private clubs and lodges at such destination resorts are limited to privately owned land, and membership may simply include a lifetime or family pass to the public skiing facilities.

Exclusivity of private ski areas
All ski areas can be seen as exclusive spaces due to the financial requirements of downhill equipment and day ticket or season ticket prices. Due to the most common construct of ski areas as for profit commercial enterprises, ski areas are already semi-private because they limit access through wealth, and by association social class. Exceptions to this include city or community owned ski areas such as Juneau, Alaska's Eaglecrest Ski Area and Sudbury, Ontario's Adanac Ski Hill, that focus on promoting recreation by subsidizing ticket prices, making used gear readily available, and youth outreach.

Because of the Right to Freedom of Association, found internationally and in the United States Bill of Rights, private social organizations that do not perform a significant public function are not forced to accept members. Therefore, social organizations including country clubs and private ski areas are allowed to have 'invitation only' membership.

Not all membership based ski areas operate with the high costs that the Yellowstone Club has become known for since opening its doors in 2000. Vermont's Hermitage Club features an 80,000 square foot clubhouse with a lap pool, spa, bowling alley and teen center but has a more modest $75,000 initiation fee. HoliMont ski area in Ellicottville, NY began as a 13 family club in 1962 and is now the largest private ski area by members. HoliMont charges $3,600 per year per family and sells day tickets to visitors on non-holiday weekdays. In comparison, an individual season pass to Whistler Blackcomb, a public resort and an official 2010 Winter Olympics host venue, costs the average adult $1,795 Canadian. Massachusetts' Mount Greylock Ski Club is another  private ski club that stands in contrast to the high levels of exclusion and opulent facilities of the Yellowstone Club. As one of the oldest ski areas in the United States, Greylock exists on the slopes of one of Massachusetts highest peaks but only operates two small surface lifts, one powered by a salvaged Ford motor. In 1950, when membership cost $3, Greylock had a 2,000 person membership and a waiting list. Today Greylock has ample space with only 150 current members at a family rate of $150.

Canada

Ontario
Due to the small size of Ontario's ski areas, many 'public' ski areas are at least partially on private land, and many private ski areas offer passes to non-members. This blurs the distinction between a public, and an exclusive or private ski club. The list following includes notable clubs advertising their private status. 

 Alpine Ski Club 

Beaver Valley Ski Club
Caledon Ski Club
Craigleith Ski Club
Georgian Peaks Club
Mansfield Ski Club

United States

California
 Buckhorn Ski and Snowboard Club –Three Points

Massachusetts
 Mount Greylock Ski Club – Williamstown

Michigan
  The Homestead –?Glen Arbor
  The Otsego Club & Resort – Gaylord

Montana
 Yellowstone Club – Big Sky

New York
 HoliMont – Ellicottville
 Hunt Hollow – Naples
 Cazenovia Ski Club – Cazenovia

Vermont
 Bear Creek Mountain Club – Plymouth
 Chapman Hill Ski Area – Williston
 The Hermitage Club At Haystack Mountain – Wilmington
 Quechee Lakes Ski Area – Quechee

Washington
 Meany Lodge – Snoqualmie Pass
 Sahalie Ski Club – Snoqualmie Pass

Wisconsin
  Ausblick Ski Club – Sussex
  Blackhawk Ski Club – Middleton
  Fox Hill Ski Area – West Bend
  Heiliger Huegel Ski Club – Hubertus

See also
 Comparison of North American ski resorts
 List of ski areas and resorts
 List of ski areas and resorts in Canada
 List of ski areas and resorts in the United States
 Membership discrimination in California social clubs

References

White Book of Ski Areas directory
Ski areas per state (NSAA)

Ski areas and resorts
Lists of ski areas and resorts
ski area
ski area